These are the full results of the 1994 IAAF World Cup which was held on 9, 10 and 11 September 1994 at the Crystal Palace National Sports Centre in London, England.

Results

100 m

200 m

400 m

800 m

1500 m

5000 m/3000 m

10,000 m

110/100 m hurdles

400 m hurdles

3000 m steeplechase

Men
9 September

4 × 100 m relay

4 × 400 m relay

High jump

Pole vault

Men
10 September

Long jump

Triple jump

Shot put

Discus throw

Hammer throw

Men
10 September

Javelin throw

References

Competition results
Full results
Full Results by IAAF (archived)

IAAF World Cup results
Events at the IAAF Continental Cups